Stewart Lithgo (born 2 June 1957) is an English former professional boxer who competed from 1979 to 1987.

References

External links

Image - Stewart Lithgo

1957 births
Cruiserweight boxers
Heavyweight boxers
English male boxers
Sportspeople from Hartlepool
Living people